Sudi Silalahi (July 13, 1949 – October 25, 2021) was an Indonesian politician and Indonesian army Lieutenant General. He was the Secretary of State of the Republic of Indonesia from October 22, 2009 to October 20, 2014. He was also the secretary of Susilo Bambang Yudhoyono when Yudhoyono was serving as Coordinating Minister for Political and Security Affairs under the administration of Megawati Soekarnoputri.

In 2012, he was part of the State visit of President Susilo Bambang Yudhoyono to the United Kingdom. He was appointed an Honorary Knight Commander of the Order of St Michael and St George. He was born in Pematangsiantar, Indonesia.

Silalahi died on October 25, 2021, aged 72, from an illness. He was buried the following day in the Kalibata Heroes Cemetery in South Jakarta.  The senior Coordinating Minister for Political, Legal and Security Affairs, Mahfud MD, led the group of mourners which included Susilo Bambang Yudhoyono (the six president of Indonesia) and his son Agus Harimurti Yudhoyono (General Secretary of the Democratic Party, Boediono and Jusuf Kalla (both former vice-presidents of Indonesia), and a number of ministers who served during the period of the Yudhoyono administration).

References 

1949 births
2021 deaths
Indonesian politicians
Indonesian military personnel
People from Pematangsiantar
Honorary Knights Commander of the Order of St Michael and St George
Deaths from the COVID-19 pandemic in Indonesia